Laspeyria flexula, the beautiful hook-tip, is a moth of the family Erebidae. The species was first described by Michael Denis and Ignaz Schiffermüller in 1775. It is found in the Palearctic realm.

The wingspan is 23–27 mm. The moth flies from May to June depending on the location.

The larvae feed on willow and Populus tremula (aspen).

External links

Fauna Europaea
Lepiforum e.V. 
De Vlinderstichting 

Boletobiinae
Moths of Japan
Moths of Europe
Moths of Asia
Taxa named by Michael Denis
Taxa named by Ignaz Schiffermüller
Moths described in 1775
Palearctic Lepidoptera